Armando Borgioli (19 March 1898 – 20 January 1945) was an Italian operatic baritone. He made his début in 1923, and appeared at Teatro alla Scala from 1927. In four seasons from 1931 he appeared at the Metropolitan Opera in New York. Borgioli made studio recordings of Aida in 1928, where he sings Amonasro, together with Giannina Arangi-Lombardi and in 1938 as Scarpia in Tosca with Maria Caniglia and Beniamino Gigli. Borgioli died when his car was bombed while driving to Parma to sing Marcello to Renata Tebaldi's first Mimi in LA BOHÈME. In the car was another baritone who was injured, yet replaced him in the role with a bandaged nose. [from RENATA TEBALDI, by Carlamaria Casanova 1995].

Sources
Metropolitan Opera, Performance record: Borgioli, Armando (Baritone) on the MetOpera Database
Rosenthal, H. and Warrack, J. "Borgioli, Armando", The Concise Oxford Dictionary of Opera, 2nd Edition, Oxford University Press, 1979, p. 57

Italian operatic baritones
1898 births
1945 deaths
20th-century Italian  male opera singers
Italian civilians killed in World War II
Deaths by airstrike during World War II